Peter Geoffrey Ingham (28 September 1956 in Sheffield, Yorkshire, England) is an English batsman, who made eight first-class appearances for Yorkshire County Cricket Club between 1979 and 1981, scoring 290 runs with a top score of 64, at an average of 20.71.  In thirteen one-day games he averaged 45.85, with a top score of 87 not out. In cricket beneath first team level – namely Second XI and Under 25, Ingham scored over 1,000 runs for Yorkshire in 1979 and 1981.

Ingham won The Cricket Society Wetherall Award for the Leading All-Rounder in English Schools Cricket in 1974 and, after his time at Yorkshire finished, he played for Northumberland in the Minor Counties.

References

External links
Cricinfo profile

1956 births
Living people
Yorkshire cricketers
English cricketers
Northumberland cricketers
Cricketers from Sheffield
English cricketers of 1969 to 2000